"Down in Tennessee" is a song written by Wayland Holyfield and recorded by American country music artist John Anderson. It was released in November 1985 as the second single from the album Tokyo, Oklahoma.  The song reached number 12 on the Billboard Hot Country Singles & Tracks chart.

Critical reception
Kip Kirby, of Billboard magazine reviewed the song favorably, saying that "the heartsick blues are well handled here by an artist who sings ballads with tears in every syllable."

Chart performance

Mark Chesnutt version

"Down in Tennessee" was also recorded by American country music artist Mark Chesnutt. It was released in June 1995 as the fourth single from the album What a Way to Live. The song reached number 23 on the Billboard Hot Country Singles & Tracks chart. It also peaked at number 7 on the Canadian RPM Country Tracks chart.

Critical reception
Deborah Evans Price, of Billboard magazine reviewed the song favorably, saying that Chesnutt's version is "just as compelling on this powerful ballad of a man dealing with lost love." She goes on to say that Chesnutt "makes you feel like hurting right along with him."

Chart performance
"Down in Tennessee" debuted at number 66 on the U.S. Billboard Hot Country Singles & Tracks for the week of June 17, 1995.

References

1985 singles
1995 singles
1985 songs
John Anderson (musician) songs
Mark Chesnutt songs
Songs written by Wayland Holyfield
Warner Records singles
Decca Records singles
Song recordings produced by Jim Ed Norman
Song recordings produced by Mark Wright (record producer)